Mikael Johansson may refer to:

Mikael Johansson (ice hockey, born 1966), retired Swedish ice hockey player who competed in 1992 Winter Olympic Games
Mikael Johansson (ice hockey, born 1981), Swedish ice hockey player, currently playing for Frölunda HC
Mikael Johansson (ice hockey, born 1985), Swedish ice hockey player, 2003 draft pick of the Detroit Red Wings
Mikael Johansson (ice hockey, born 1995), Swedish ice hockey player, currently playing for Växjö Lakers
Mikael Johansson (politician) (born 1960), Swedish Green Party politician